The Los Angeles  Olympic Organizing Committee for the Games of the XXIII Olympiad, or LAOOC, also known as the Los Angeles Olympic Organizing Committee, was an informal name for the Los Angeles Olympic Organizing Committee for the Games of the XXIII Olympiad. The President of LAOOC was Peter Ueberroth.

References

1984 Summer Olympics
Organising Committees for the Olympic Games
Summer Olympics
Sports in Los Angeles